The Douglas Main Post Office in Douglas, Wyoming, United States, was built in 1909 as part of a facilities improvement program by the United States Post Office Department.  The post office in Douglas was nominated to the National Register of Historic Places as part of a thematic study comprising twelve Wyoming post offices built to standardized USPO plans in the early twentieth century.

References

External links
 at the National Park Service's NRHP database
Douglas Main Post Office at the Wyoming State Historic Preservation Office

Neoclassical architecture in Wyoming
Government buildings completed in 1909
Buildings and structures in Converse County, Wyoming
Post office buildings in Wyoming
Post office buildings on the National Register of Historic Places in Wyoming
National Register of Historic Places in Converse County, Wyoming